Benjamin Howard Baker (13 February 1892 – 10 September 1987) was an English athlete who excelled in a wide range of sports, mostly in association football and high jump.

In team sports, Baker was goalkeeper for England, Chelsea, Everton and  Oldham Athletic football clubs, having previously played for the renowned amateur team, the Corinthians. He played for the "Amateurs" in the 1925 FA Charity Shield. He was also an international-level water polo goalkeeper. Baker initially played as a defender, and took the keeper position after his ankle was damaged in a naval mine sweeping operation during World War I.

In singles, doubles and mixed doubles, Baker competed in the 1929 Northern Qualifying Tournament for Wimbledon without making the main draw in any event and won the 1932 Welsh Covered Courts tennis competition.

Individually, Baker held British records in the high jump (1.95 m, from 1921 to 1946) and triple jump. He competed in these events at the 1912 and 1920 Olympic Games and finished in 6–11th places. At the Northern Counties Championships he won the high jump (1911–14, 1919–21), 120 yd hurdles (1921) and discus throw (1920); he also won the long jump at the 1920 Northern Olympic Trials. After retiring from sports Baker joined the family firm producing soap and chemicals and became a renowned businessman in the Liverpool area.

Although Baker was sometimes known as Benjamin Howard-Baker (such as in 'Play Up Corinth - A history of the Corinthian Football Club') his baptism record at St Margaret, Anfield on 28 March 1892 shows his Christian names as 'Benjamin Howard', and his surname as 'Baker'. His father had the same name.

References

External links

England profile
Everton Football Club profile
Chelsea Football Club profile

1892 births
1987 deaths
English footballers
England international footballers
Association football goalkeepers
Blackburn Rovers F.C. players
Chelsea F.C. players
Corinthian F.C. players
Everton F.C. players
Liverpool F.C. players
Preston North End F.C. players
Oldham Athletic A.F.C. players
English male high jumpers
English male triple jumpers
Olympic athletes of Great Britain
Athletes (track and field) at the 1912 Summer Olympics
Athletes (track and field) at the 1920 Summer Olympics
Footballers from Liverpool
English Football League players
English Football League representative players